Tajarak or Tejerk may refer to:

 Tajarak, Hamadan, Hamadan Province, Iran
 Tajarak, Kerman, Kerman Province, Iran
 Tejerk, alternate name of Tezerj, Jorjafak, Kerman Province, Iran
 Tajarak, Qazvin, Qazvin Province, Iran